Dean is an unincorporated community in Appanoose County, Iowa, United States.

History
Dean was platted in 1873. It was named for Henry Clay Dean. Dean's population was 47 in 1902, and 80 in 1925.

References

Unincorporated communities in Appanoose County, Iowa
1873 establishments in Iowa
Populated places established in 1873
Unincorporated communities in Iowa